V-Bor is a commercially packaged form of borax pentahydrate (Na2B4O7·5H2O). It is produced by the Searles Valley Minerals company from minerals mined at Searles Lake. It has most of the same uses as borax. It is also used to neutralize skins/hides in leather tanning, corrects boron deficiency in plants, reduces the melting temperature in glass processes, is a fire retardant in cellulose insulation, and is used to make a bleaching agent for home laundry.

References

Borates
Nesoborates
Leathermaking
Cleaning products
Household chemicals